Stafford Smith (born June 18, 1998) is an American professional stock car racing driver. He competes part-time in the ARCA Menards Series West, driving the No. 21 Ford Fusion for Kart Idaho Racing.

Racing career

ARCA Menards Series West

Smith made his ARCA Menards Series West debut in 2016 (then the NASCAR K&N Pro Series West) at Tucson Speedway,  finishing just outside the top-10 in 11th. Smith returned at Colorado National Speedway, finishing 11th as well. Over 9 races run in the season, Smith collected 2 top-ten finishes, coming at Utah Motorsports Campus (10th) and at his home track, Meridian Speedway (7th). In 2017, Smith ran all but 2 races. Smith once again collected 2 top-ten finishes in 2017, at Evergreen Speedway (10th) and at Meridian (10th). Smith did not return to the series until 2021. He ran three races at Portland International Raceway, the Las Vegas Motor Speedway Bullring, and All-American Speedway, finishing 8th, 12th, and 6th respectively. Smith will return for the 2022 season, beginning at Irwindale Speedway. Originally meant to be in the No. 08, but was renumbered to the No. 21.

NASCAR K&N Pro Series East
Smith ran 3 races in the 2017 NASCAR K&N Pro Series East season. He debuted at Berlin Raceway finishing 15th. He finished 16th at Thompson Speedway and 17th at New Hampshire Motor Speedway.

Motorsports career results

K&N Pro Series East

ARCA Menards Series West

References

External links 

1998 births
Living people
ARCA Menards Series drivers
NASCAR drivers